The R385 is a regional route in South Africa that connects Olifantshoek with Hopetown via Postmasburg and Douglas.

Route 
The R385 begins south of Olifantshoek, at a junction with the N14 National Route. It begins by going south-east for 54 kilometres to the town of Postmasburg, where it intersects with the R325 Road. It continues eastwards for 50 kilometres to meet the R31 Road north of Lime Acres. At this junction, the R385 turns southwards and proceeds to enter Lime Acres.

From Lime Acres, the R385 continues southwards for 63 kilometres to meet the N8 National Route at Campbell. It proceeds southwards for 28 kilometres to meet the southern terminus of the R370 Road and cross the Vaal River to enter the town of Douglas as Bowker Street.

In Douglas Central, the R385 reaches a junction with the R357 Road (Roper Street; Loch Street) and becomes co-signed with it eastwards for 3.5 kilometres before the R357 becomes its own road north-east while the R385 turns to the south-east. The R385 continues south-east, following the Orange River, for 69 kilometres to reach its end at a junction with the N12 National Route just north of Hopetown.

External links
 Routes Travel Info

References

Regional Routes in the Northern Cape